Mike Denness captained the English cricket team in Australia in 1974–75, playing as England in the 1974-75 Ashes series against the Australians and as the MCC in their other matches on the tour. They lost the Test series and the Ashes 4–1 thanks to the battering they received from the fast bowling of Dennis Lillee and Jeff Thomson, but won the One Day International and with Lillee and Thomson injured they came back to win the Sixth Test by an innings.

The Manager
England was untried as a consistent winning combination away from home. Their captain had been questioned both as a Test player and leader. Their batting was shallow in specialists and their fast bowling smacked of insurance policies and endeavour rather than hostility. But the touring party was one that demanded respect. There were no fewer than ten members who had previously played against Australian under Australian conditions. Two other players had proved themselves against the old foe in England. It was a professional side, professionally chosen, with a professional knowledge of the gaps that existed in the make-up of the Australian side. It seemed they would give a professional account of themselves.
Frank Tyson

Alec Bedser had toured Australia in the 1946-47, 1950-51 and 1954-55 Ashes series as a player, 1958-59 as a journalist and 1962-63 as the assistant-manager, so was well known down under and very knowledgeable about Australian conditions. He was one of the great servants of English cricket and took a record 236 Test wickets at an average of 24.89 despite carrying England's bowling attack against the powerful Australian teams of the post-war era. Bedser was made an England selector in 1962 and Chairman of Selectors in 1969, a post he held until 1981. As a bowler he had been willing to toil all day if his captain demanded and saw team spirit and dedication as qualities needed by any England player, which led to problems with his two best players, Geoff Boycott and John Snow, who he did not see as team players.

Geoff Boycott was a dedicated if charmless opening batsman who had made 657 runs (93.85) in the 1970-71 Ashes series, but was an awkward tourist who had argued with the Australian umpires. He was named in the touring squad, but was unhappy that he had been dropped for most of the summer and believed that he should have been made England captain instead of Denness. As a result, he announced that he was unavailable for personal reasons and remained in self-imposed exile until 1977. The press speculated on his loss of form, the need to organise his 1975 Benefit Year and a fear of Dennis Lillee, though the Australian fast bowler had not yet returned to cricket after his back injury. Boycott was later accused of cowardice, his many critics saying that he had avoided playing the Australian and West Indian teams of 1974-76 because of their fast bowlers, but no one in the England camp had any idea that Lillee and Thomson would be such a threat until the First Test. Illingworth later said that Boycott was the only England batsmen with the technique to face Dennis Lillee and Jeff Thomson and it was generally agreed that his loss was a blow to the touring team's chances.

John Snow was a mercurial fast bowler whose short-pitched fast bowling had taken 31 wickets (22.83) in 1970-71 and had knocked out Garth McKenzie and Terry Jenner, leading to trouble with the Australian umpires over intimidatory bowling. Crowd demonstrations in the Seventh Test after Jenner was struck on the head led to Ray Illingworth leading the England team off the field. Boycott and Snow were both disciplined on their return from Australia and Snow wrote "that the selectors would have to be shot before I made a Test comeback". Mike Denness expressly asked for Snow to tour the West Indies in 1973-74, where he had taken 27 wickets (18.66) in 1967-68, but Bedser over-ruled him because Snow "was not a good team man". Denness asked for Snow again in 1974, but when "Alec accepted the managership in Australia Snow’s chances flew out the window". Snow was recalled to play Australia at home in the 1975 Ashes series, where he took more wickets than any other England bowler.

The Captain
The pace of Thomson and the deadly accuracy and cunning of Lillee unnerved England and I honestly don't believe that Mike Denness had sufficient status and experience as a player and captain to help his batsmen get over what were deep psychological wounds, particularly as he himself was having such a wretched time of it with the bat.
Tom Graveney

Michael Henry Denness was the leader of the 1974-75 touring team and the first Scottish-born captain of the England cricket team (Douglas Jardine was born in India of Scottish parents). The late 1960s and early 1970s had seen a split in the ranks of English cricket as the nature of the captaincy. The conservatives saw cricket as uniting the Commonwealth with sportsmanship and social skills as important as cricketing ability and preferred the old style amateur captains with public school backgrounds. In the 1960s they had supported the avuncular Colin Cowdrey, but he was a naturally cautious captain whose stints as England captain were broken by ill-timed injuries. The reformers called for tough, professional captains dedicated to winning Test matches, such as Brian Close and Ray Illingworth, who succeeded Cowdrey in 1969 when he damaged his Achilles heel. Illingworth's success as captain gave England 27 consecutive Tests without defeat, including regaining the Ashes in 1970-71 and retaining them in 1972. However, Illingworth could only maintain his place as long as he was winning and he was sacked minutes after losing to the West Indies by an innings and 226 runs in 1973. Mike Denness had succeeded Cowdrey as the captain of Kent and was the surprise choice to lead England to the West Indies in 1973-74, though he had been Tony Lewis's vice-captain in India in 1972-73. Denness was seen a compromise candidate as he was a university graduate and a professional cricketer, though he was not a regular England player. Others pressed for the return of Cowdrey, Close or Illingworth. Boycott thought he should have the job and proved highly critical of Denness's captaincy. The Scot made a good start in the West Indies by drawing the series 1-1 and dealing diplomatically with the problems arising in the Caribbean in the wake of the exclusion of South Africa from Test cricket, though the press found him a bit dour. In 1974 he did even better, beating India 3-0 while making 289 runs (96.33), though Boycott opined that a donkey could have led the team to victory. He therefore went to Australia with some degree of confidence, but soon things went wrong. He picked up a mystery virus which prevented him from playing and affected his form. Though a natural player of spin he was soon found to have a weakness against the Australian fast bowlers and suffered in the Tests, so that he became the first Test captain to drop himself for bad form, for the Fourth Test at Sydney. Denness received a measure of public support for this decision, although he also wryly told of one letter which was simply addressed to "Mike Denness, Cricketer". "If this letter reaches you," it said, "the Post Office think more of you than I do". He returned for Fifth Test in Adelaide after an injury to John Edrich and did slightly better, top-scoring in the first innings with 51. Ironically, in the Sixth Test, also at Sydney, when Dennis Lillee and Jeff Thomson were unfit to play, Denness made 188 - the highest Test score by an England captain in Australia - and won by an innings. He beat New Zealand with a batting average of 240.00 and retained the captaincy for the 1975 Cricket World Cup, where England lost to Australia in the semi-finals. He lost the First Test of the 1975 Ashes series by an innings and was replaced by the combative Tony Greig, never to play Test cricket again.

Batting
It came as a severe shock to the nervous system of the England batsmen when Australia suddenly produced the twin terrors Lillee and Thomson...and my heart went out to the England batsmen. I think the technique of several of the England batsmen left a lot to be desired, but all the coaching and textbook reading in the world could not have prepared them for the sort of short-pitched deliveries that kicked head high and at something like 100 mph.
Tom Graveney

The England batsmen had gorged themselves on the Indian spin bowling in the summer of 1974; David Lloyd averaged 260.00, Keith Fletcher 189.00, John Edrich 101.50, Mike Denness 96.33, Dennis Amiss 92.50 and Tony Greig 79.50. They did well in the rain-affected series against Pakistan and were chosen en masse for the tour of Australia, along with Geoff Boycott who had missed most of the summer due to poor form. Boycott declined to tour and was replaced by Brian Luckhurst, a Kent opener who had made 455 runs (56.87) in 1970-71 and two centuries despite badly bruised fingers None of these had any great experience in facing fast bowling, which had been in short supply in the last few years of Test cricket. This was not seen as a problem as Australian pitches were usually good for batting or spin and while Dennis Lillee had recovered from his back injury he was not seen as a problem. The pipe-smoking Dennis Amiss was a heavy run-maker for Warwickshire who had once carried his bat for 262 out of 432 against the West Indies in 1973-74, but was bounced out of cricket by the Australian and West Indian fast bowlers of the mid-1970s. He returned with a square on stance to make 203 against Michael Holding at the Oval in 1976. David Lloyd made 214 not out against India in his second Test, but failed to make another 50 in Tests and never played after this tour. In 1965 John Edrich made a record 310 not out New Zealand in the Third Test at Headingley with a record 52 fours and 5 sixes, but was hit on the head by a Peter Pollock bouncer in his next Test, forcing him to retire hurt and thereafter he had a distaste for fast bowling. He changed into a solid and unspectacular accumulator of runs and in the 1970-71 Ashes series he batted for a record 33 hours and 26 minutes making 648 runs (72.00) and two centuries. Keith Fletcher had a promising career, but like most of the England batsmen was a player of spin with limited technique against real pace and suffered as a result, but came back to make 146 in the Sixth Test and later became a successful captain of Essex. Colin Cowdrey was the first man to have played in a hundred Tests and was asked to reinforce the England squad after the injuries suffered in the First Test. This was his record sixth tour of Australia and he played in the Second Test in Perth just two days after arriving from England. The 6'7" South African born Tony Greig was England's best batsman of the tour, using his height to slash the fast bowlers over the slips and having the advantage of batting at number 6 after the earlier batsmen had faced the brunt of the bowling. The wicketkeeper Alan Knott who came in at number 7 was the next best batsmen, a perky, Punch-like character with a sound defence and some unorthodox shots. Fred Titmus had had great success with the bat on his previous tours in 1962-63 and 1965-66 and had a Test average of 48.89 in Australia. Chris Old was once liken to Ian Botham in his ability as an all-rounder and made six first class centuries.

Bowling
It was impossible to recall when the initial selection of an England touring party to Australia had included five out-and-out quick bowlers. Perhaps Lever's experience was intended to underwrite the hard-wicket fallibility of his fellow fast bowling quartet, who had not enjoyed a successful tour in the West Indies...The fact that the England selectors placed all their trump cards in the fast bowling had, also dangerously weakened the batting make-up of the touring party.
Frank Tyson

Without John Snow England depended on the injury-prone Bob Willis to spearhead their fast bowling. Though his chest on action could generate real pace his knees could not take the strain and after bouncing the Australians in the First Test he was reduced to fast-medium pace. In support he had a host of quality fast-medium bowlers; Geoff Arnold, Mike Hendrick, Chris Old and Peter Lever who were able to exploit the seaming pitches and heavy atmosphere in England, but who suffered on the flat, dry pitches in Australia. Arnold shared the new ball with John Snow. but a series of injuries and Snow's fall from grace prevented what could have been a productive partnership, in 1974 he and Old dismissed India for 42. Old was 6'3" Yorkshireman who suffered from a long list of injuries and niggles and so rarely fulfilled his great promise. Hendrick was a gloomy looking bowler who always seemed to beat the bat without success and holds the record for taking the most Test wickets without having captured 5 in a single innings. Lever had toured Australia in 1970-71 without great success, but in this series took his best Test figures of 6/38 in the Sixth Test at Sydney. In the following tour of New Zealand he hit the tailender Ewen Chatfield on the head with a bouncer and almost killed him, Chatworth was saved by cardiopulmonary resuscitation from the team physiotherapist Bernie Thomas and a distraught Lever had to be helped off the field. Before the arrival of Ian Botham the 6'7" Tony Greig was the Golden Boy of English cricket and has the lowest bowling average of any man who averages over 40 with the bat in Tests. Initially he was a medium paced bowler whose great height produced awkward bounce, but in 1973-74 he switched to off-spin and took 13/156 to win the Fifth Test and square the series. Fred Titmus was a veteran off spin bowler who in 1974 become the fourth man after W.G. Grace, Wilfred Rhodes and George Hirst to take 2,500 wickets and make 20,000 runs in first class cricket, and "if accolades like that don't make a bloke feel old, then I don't know what does!" He had made his debut in 1947 and thought his selection was a joke, but Alec Bedser told him "our cupboard is pretty bare when it comes to young players". The Cockney took his best Test figures of 7/79 at the Sydney Cricket Ground in 1962-63 with his flighted off-spinners, but had lost four toes in a boating accident in 1968 and had not played in Tests since. Derek Underwood was a first class bowler from his teens who bowled immaculate slow-medium spinners and used to say that bowling was a "low mentality profession: plug away, line and length, until there's a mistake” as sooner or later every batsmen would make a mistake. On damp English wickets he earned the nickname "Deadly" for his ability to make the ball leap and turn, as when he took 10/82 against Australia at Headingley in 1972 and 13/71 against Pakistan at Lord's in 1974.

Fielding
Alan Knott had been chosen as a Wisden Cricketer of the Year in 1970 and was regarded as the finest keeper in the world. In this series he dismissed 24 Australian batsmen, a new Test record and Rod Marsh admitted that he learned much of his trade from watching "Knotty" in the 1970-71 series. Knott continually exercised before play and between balls and was a highly entertaining player whose partnership with his teammate Derek Underwood was legendary. Others thought that the reserve keeper Bob Taylor was even better, a quiet, unassuming player whose wicketkeeping was so tidy as to be invisible. Colin Cowdrey was an outstanding slip fielder whose 120 Test catches was a record by a fieldsman at the time. He was joined in the slips by John Edrich, though he was a specialist gully fielder. Tony Greig and Bob Willis was an excellent slip and close fielders, while Mike Denness "was by repute...the best fieldsman in his own side".

Touring Team

First Test – Brisbane

See Main Article - 1974-75 Ashes series

Second Test – Perth

See Main Article - 1974-75 Ashes series

Third Test – Melbourne

See Main Article - 1974-75 Ashes series

First One Day International - Melbourne

See Main Article - 1974-75 Ashes series

Fourth Test – Sydney

See Main Article - 1974-75 Ashes series

Fifth Test – Adelaide

See Main Article - 1974-75 Ashes series

Sixth Test – Sydney

See Main Article - 1974-75 Ashes series

References

Bibliography
 Peter Arnold, The Illustrated Encyclopaedia of World of Cricket, W.H. Smith, 1985
 Ashley Brown, A Pictorial History of Cricket, Bison Books Ltd, 1988
 Criss Freddi, The Guinness Book of Cricket Blunders, Guinness Publishing, 1996
 David Gower, Heroes and Contemporaries, Granada Publishing Ltd, 1985
 Tom Graveney and Norman Miller, The Ten Greatest Test Teams, Sidgewick and Jackson, 1988
 John Snow, Cricket Rebel: An Autobiography, Littlehampton Book Services Ltd, 1976
 E.W. Swanton, Swanton in Australia with MCC 1946-1975, Fontana, 1977
 Alan Synge, Sins of Omission, The Story of the Test Selectors 1899-1990, Pelham Books, 1990
 Frank Tyson, Test of Nerves, Test series 1974-75 Australia versus England, Manark Pty Ltd, 1975
 Bob Willis and Patrick Murphy, Starting With Grace, A Pictorial Celebration of Cricket 1864-1986, Stanley Paul, 1986

Annual reviews
 Playfair Cricket Annual 1975
 Wisden Cricketers' Almanack 1976

Further reading
 Mark Browning, Rod Marsh: A Life in Cricket, Rosenberg Publishing, 2003
 Ian Brayshaw, The Chappell Era, ABC Enterprises, 1984
 Greg Chappell, Old Hands Showed The Way, Test Series Official Book 1986-87, The Clashes for the Ashes, Australia vs England, Playbill Sport Publication, 1986
 Ian Chappell, Austin Robertson and Paul Rigby, Chappelli Has the Last Laugh, Lansdowne Press, 1980
 Ian Chappell and Ashley Mallett, Hitting Out: The Ian Chappell Story, Orion, 2006
 Colin Cowdrey, M. C. C. The Autobiography of a Cricketer, Coronet Books, 1977
 Bill Frindall, The Wisden Book of Test Cricket 1877-1978, Wisden, 1979
 Colin Firth, Pageant of Cricket, The MacMillan Company of Australia,1987
 Chris Harte, A History of Australian Cricket, Andre Deutsch, 1993
 Ed Jaggard, Garth: The Story of Graham McKenzie, Fremantle Arts Centre Press, 1993
 Ken Kelly and David Lemmon, Cricket Reflections: Five Decades of Cricket Photographs, Heinemann, 1985
 Dennis Lillee, Lillee, My Life in Cricket, Methuen Australia, 1982
 Dennis Lillee, Menace: the Autobiography, Headline Book Publishing, 2003
 Brian Luckhurst and Mike Baldwin, Boot Boy to President, KOS Media, 2004
 Ashley Mallett, Rowdy, Lynton Publications, 1973
 Ashley Mallett, Spin Out, Garry Sparke & Associates, 1977
 Ashley Mallett, One of a Kind: The Doug Walters Story, Orion, 2009
 Rod Marsh, The Gloves of Irony, Pan, 1999
 Adrian McGregor, Greg Chappell, Collins, 1985
 Mark Peel, The Last Roman: A Biography of Colin Cowdrey, Andre Deutsch Ltd, 1999
 Ray Robinson, On Top Down Under, Cassell, 1975
 E.W. Swanton(ed), The Barclays World of Cricket, Collins, 1986
 Derek Underwood, Beating the Bat: An Autobiography, S.Paul, 1975
 Bob Willis, Lasting the Pace, Collins, 1985

Videos and DVDs
Allan Border and David Gower, The Best of the Ashes - 1970 - 1987, 2 Entertain Video, 1991

External links
CricketArchive tour itinerary

1974 in Australian cricket
1974 in English cricket
1974–75 Australian cricket season
1975 in Australian cricket
1975 in English cricket
1974-75
International cricket competitions from 1970–71 to 1975
1974-75